The 20th Regiment Illinois Volunteer Infantry was an infantry regiment that served in the Union Army during the American Civil War.

Service
The 20th Illinois Infantry was organized at Joliet, Illinois and mustered into Federal service on June 13, 1861, for a three-year enlistment.

The regiment was mustered out of service on July 16, 1865.

Total strength and casualties
The regiment suffered 7 officers and 132 enlisted men who were killed in action or who died of their wounds and 1 officer and 191 enlisted men who died of disease, for a total of 331 fatalities.

Commanders
Colonel C. Carroll Marsh -resigned on April 22, 1863.
 Colonel Daniel Bradley -  discharged February 13, 1865.
Lieutenant Colonel Henry King - mustered out with the regiment.

See also
List of Illinois Civil War Units
Illinois in the American Civil War

Notes

References
The Civil War Archive

Units and formations of the Union Army from Illinois
1861 establishments in Illinois
Military units and formations established in 1861
Military units and formations disestablished in 1865